The Baker-McMillan Cadet is an American, high-wing, strut-braced, open-cockpit, single-seat glider that was designed in 1929 by Frank R. Gross and produced by Baker-McMillan (Different sources variously spell the company name Baker-MacMillen, Baker Macmillen or Baker MacMillen).

Design and development
The Cadet was designed by Dr. Gross, a former member of the Akaflieg Darmstadt, in 1929 as an improvement over the primary gliders then in use and as an aircraft that would offer soaring capability.

The Cadet is built with a steel tube fuselage and a wooden wing that is supported by dual parallel struts, with jury struts. The tail is a wire-braced wooded structure. The whole aircraft is covered in doped aircraft fabric covering.

At least 30 and perhaps as many as 40 Cadets were constructed.

Operational history
The Cadet was the first glider to be flown at Elmira, New York after Wolfgang Klemperer, Warren Eaton and Earl Southee surveyed the area and determined it had potential for soaring flights. One flight was flown by Jack O'Meara, a factory pilot for Baker-McMillan, who had a flight of one hour and 38 minutes from Elmira's South Mountain.

One Cadet was flown from water on twin floats. On another occasion four Cadets were towed aloft at the same time and released by a Goodyear Blimp over Akron, Ohio.

In March 2011 two Cadets remained on the Federal Aviation Administration registry.

Aircraft on display
National Soaring Museum - 1
Thermal G Museum, Waterford, Pennsylvania - 1

Specifications (Cadet)

See also

References

1920s United States sailplanes
Aircraft first flown in 1929
High-wing aircraft